Spitalfields Market is a traders' market as well as a food and art market located in Spitalfields, Central London. Traders began operating around 1666, after the Great Fire of London, where the market stands today. The Spitalfields regeneration programme that ended in 2005, resulted in two new public spaces – Bishops Square and Crispin Place, which restored several historic streets and resulted in more independent retailers and restaurants. Spitalfields Market is situated in the London Borough of Tower Hamlets. It is surrounded by Lamb Street, Old Spitalfields market, Brushfield Street and Bishops Square.

History

Wholesale Market 
In 1682, King Charles II officially granted John Balch a Royal Charter allowing him to hold a market every Thursday and Saturday in Spital Square. Over time, the market became one of the main fruit and vegetable markets for London - alongside Covent Garden Market. 

The reputation of the market encouraged Huguenot silk weavers to settle in the area. They were fleeing France, following the Revocation of the Edict of Nantes in 1685. Some of their houses are still standing around Fournier Street, which is now a conservation area. In the mid-1700s, Irish weavers also settled in the area following the decline in the Irish linen industry. The growth in the area led to the establishment of Hawksmoor’s Christ Church in 1729, which consecrated Spitalfields becoming a parish in its own right.

After the 1820s, Spitalfields fell into decline, gaining a reputation as a cheap area in which to live, proving a magnet to numerous waves of immigrants. Jewish refugees filled the area, mainly fleeing Pogroms in the Russian Empire, while some were entrepreneurs from the Netherlands. Between the 1880s and 1970s, Spitalfields was one of the largest Jewish communities in England, having more than forty synagogues.

By 1876 the market itself had fallen into decline. Recognising the need to improve the market, a former market porter called Robert Horner bought a short lease and built a new market building at a cost of £80,000, which opened in 1893. In 1920, the City of London acquired direct control of the Market, and subsequently extended the site. 

Due to traffic congestion, lack of space for parking lorries, as well as out of date market buildings (e.g. poor refrigeration facilities) - the wholesale market was relocated out of the City in the early 1990s. This followed the move of Covent Garden Market and Billingsgate Fish Market out of the city centre. The new, purpose built location in Leyton - named New Spitalfields Market) - opened in May 1991. A market remained on the site however - serving the public rather than trade customers.

Regeneration 
By the mid-20th century, most of the Jewish community had left the area and since the 1970s, a Bangladeshi community has been flourishing. New cultures, trades and business now fill the area including the renowned Brick Lane restaurant district. There is still some evidence of the various communities from the past that stand today – a Huguenot church, Methodist chapel, Jewish synagogue, and Muslim mosque amongst new stores, housing, restaurants and markets. 

In the mid 2000s, the market site was redeveloped. The new development known as Spitalfields, is located within the areas known as Bishops Square, Market Street & Crispin Place, which includes the Spitalfields Traders Market in Crispin Place. Directly adjacent with a seamless boundary and shared covered roof, is Old Spitalfields Market, situated in the Horner Buildings.

Spitalfields Market currently is open every day of the week. It hosts various retail brands, street-food stalls, bars and restaurants, and independent traders showcasing handcrafted goods, artwork, fashion, and jewellery. It also hosts public art and events programmes.

See also 
 Old Spitalfields Market
 New Spitalfields Market
 Leadenhall Market
 Old Billingsgate Market
 Petticoat Lane Market
 Smithfield Market

Notes

References
Institute of Historical Research: British History
BBC News: £400m Spitalfields project opens
BBC News: In Pictures - Spitalfields celebrates French impact
BBC News: Spitalfields bows to market pressure
The Financial Times: Spitalfields gets into the mix
The Telegraph: London street markets

External links
Spitalfields Market - Official Website

Spitalfields